Frost Over the World was a television interview and news talk show, with Sir David Frost as host. The show was broadcast on Al Jazeera English. Frost, a famed English television presenter, interviewed well-known  politicians, diplomats, writers, thinkers, academics, entertainers, business leaders, scientists, humanitarians, and other newsmakers. The editor of the programme was the journalist Charlie Courtauld and producers include Richard Brock, Kate Newman, Alex Nunes and Portia Walker.

The show launched in November 2006 and Britain's then Prime Minister, Tony Blair, was the first guest to appear.

The show was replaced by The Frost Interview on Al Jazeera English. Unlike Frost Over the World, which was set in a studio, The Frost Interview involved David Frost travelling around the world. Frost hosted that show until his death in 2013.

Guests
There have been many high-profile guests on the show. Guests have included:
 
 Aron Ralston
 Abdiweli Mohamed Ali
 Abhisit Vejjajiva
 Akbar Ahmed
 Alan Dershowitz
 Alex Salmond
 Aloe Blacc
 Álvaro Uribe
 Amitabh Bachchan
 Anders Fogh Rasmussen
  Andrew Eborn - President Octopus TV 
 Andy Murray
 Angela Gheorghiu
 Annie Lennox
 Anthony Hopkins
 Ban Ki-moon
 Barbara Stocking
 Benazir Bhutto
 Bonnie Greer
 Benjamin Netanyahu
 Bill Gates
 Boutros Boutros-Ghali
 Charlie Wolf
 Christian Louboutin
 Christina Ricci
 Christopher Hitchens
 Cuba Gooding, Jr.
 Dambisa Moyo
 Daniel Junge
 Daniel Ortega
 David Cameron
 David Miliband
 David Petraeus
 Dennis Kucinich
 Dennis Ross
 Derren Brown
 Desmond Tutu
 Dominique de Villepin
 Donald Rumsfeld
 Doug Wead
 Douglas Hurd

 Emeli Sandé
 Emilio Barbarani
 Eoin Colfer
 Evo Morales
 F. W. de Klerk
 Fawzia Koofi
 Frank Luntz
 Garry Kasparov
 Gary Lightbody
 Gene Robinson
 George Clooney
 George H. W. Bush
 Gilbert & George
 Hamid Karzai
 Hamish McRae
 Harry Shearer
 Hatem Saif El Nasr
 Helen Clark
 Helen Mirren
 Henry Kissinger
 Hina Rabbani Khar
 Imran Khan
 Íngrid Betancourt
 Jacob Zuma
 Jean-Claude Juncker
 Jeffrey Sachs
 Jeremy Clarkson
 Jerry Springer
 Jimmy Wales
 Johan Galtung
 John Bradley
 Jorge Castañeda Gutman
 John Major
 Juan Manuel Santos
 John McCain
 Julia Gillard
 Julian Assange
 Julian Zelizer
 Jyrki Katainen
 Kate Nash

 Kristin Scott Thomas
 Laura Schwartz
 Laurie Penny
 Lawrence Freedman
 Léa Seydoux
 Lewis Hamilton
 Loretta Napoleoni
 Louis Garrel
 Luis de Guindos
 Luiz Inácio Lula da Silva
 Lynda Rose
 Marwan Bishara
 Madeleine Albright
 Manu Chao
 Margaret Chan
 Mark Knopfler
 Mark Malloch Brown
 Mark Regev
 Martin Lindstrom
 Martin McGuinness
 Martti Ahtisaari
 Maryam al-Khawaja
 M. Cherif Bassiouni
 Medard Mulangala
 Merhezia Labidi Maiza
 Mia Farrow
 Michael Caine
 Michelle Bachelet
 Mikhail Gorbachev
 Mikheil Saakashvili
 Mohamed A. El-Erian
 Mohamed Nasheed
 Mohsen Makhmalbaf
 Morgan Tsvangirai
 Mozah bint Nasser Al Missned
 Muhammad Tahir-ul-Qadri
 Muhammad Yunus
 Nadine Labaki
 Nawaz Sharif

 Nazenin Ansari
 Ngozi Okonjo-Iweala
 Noel Gallagher
 Omar al-Bashir
 Paul Krugman
 Paul Mason
 Penny Wong
 Pervez Musharraf
 Portia Walker
 Ribal al-Assad
 Ricardo Lagos
 Richard Dawkins
 Roberto Benigni
 Robert De Niro
 Robert Gates
 Roger Waters
 Roger Federer
 Sanusi Lamido Sanusi
 Sarah Jessica Parker
 Sebastian Coe
 Sharmeen Obaid-Chinoy
 Sheikh Hasina
 Shimon Peres
 Shukria Barakzai
 Stephen Kinzer
 Steve Redgrave
 Steven Soderbergh
 Suha Arafat
 Tarja Halonen
 Tony Blair
 Tracey Emin
 Vicky Pryce
 Vincent Nichols
 Wesley Clark
 William Hague
 William Patey
 William Shawcross
 Xenia Dormandy
 Yoko Ono
 Zbigniew Brzezinski
 Zhang Weiwei

References

External links
 Official website
 Archive on YouTube
 Doug Wead interview with David Frost on RonPaul.net

2006 British television series debuts
2012 British television series endings
Al Jazeera English original programming
2000s British television talk shows
2010s British television talk shows
English-language television shows